This is a list of the 2010 European Men's Handball Championship squads. Each team had until 15 December 2009 to register 28 players. Of these 28 players, the national associations must choose 16 players at least one day before the tournament. After this a maximum of two players can be replaced with a player from the original 28. After the main round has started, yet another player can be replaced.

Group A

Head coach: 

* Mirko Alilović (Ademar León)
 Goran Čarapina (RK Poreč)
 Marin Šego (RK Zagreb)
 Feldspieler: Ivano Balić (RK Zagreb)
 Damir Bičanić (Ademar León)
 Vladimir Božić (BM Ciudad Encantada)
 Ivan Čupić (RK Velenje)
 Domagoj Duvnjak (HSV Hamburg)
 Jakov Gojun (RK Zagreb) 
 Nikola Kedžo (HSG Düsseldorf)
 Marko Kopljar (RK Zagreb)
 Denis Buntić (Ademar León) 
 Antonio Kovačević (Dubrava)
 Blaženko Lacković (HSV Hamburg)
 Marino Marić (RK Zagreb)
 Vedran Mataija (RK Poreč) 
 Petar Metličić (BM Ciudad Real)
 Duje Miljak (TV Emsdetten)
 Marko Mrđenović (RK Nexe)
 Željko Musa (RK Trimo Trebnje)
 Ivan Pešić (KC Veszprém)
 Luka Raković (RK Bjelovar)
 Manuel Štrlek (RK Zagreb) 
 Tonči Valčić (RK Zagreb)
 Igor Vori (HSV Hamburg)
 Ljubo Vukić (RK Zagreb)
 Drago Vuković (VfL Gummersbach)
 Vedran Zrnić (VfL Gummersbach)

Head coach: 

* Steinar Ege (FCK Håndbold)
 Ole Erevik (KIF Kolding)
 Magnus Dahl (Fyllingen Håndball)
 Håvard Tvedten (Pevafersa BM Valladolid)
 Thomas Skoglund (GOG Svendborg TGI)
 Lars Erik Bjørnsen (Team Tvis Holstebro) 
 Christian Spanne (Drammen HK)
 Stian Vatne (Füchse Berlin) 
 Erlend Mamelund (FCK Håndbold) 
 Kristian Kjelling (AaB Håndbold)
 Espen Lie Hansen (Drammen HK)
 Børge Lund (THW Kiel) 
 Vegard Samdahl (Wisła Płock)
 Kjetil Strand (Füchse Berlin)
 Christoffer Rambo (IL Runar) 
 Thomas Drange (FCK Håndbold)
 Bjarte Myrhol (Rhein-Neckar Löwen)
 Frank Løke (RK Zagreb)
 Einar Sand Koren (FCK Håndbold)

Head coach: 

* Oleg Grams (Medwedi Tschechow)
 Wassili Filippow (Medwedi Tschechow) 
 Oleg Sotow (Medwedi Tschechow)
 Dmitri Kowaljow (Medwedi Tschechow)
 Jegor Jewdokimow (BM Ciudad Real)
 Oleg Skopinzew (Medwedi Tschechow) 
 Alexander Tschernoiwanow (Medwedi Tschechow)
 Anton Mersljutin (Sarja Kaspija Astrachan)
 Wadim Bogdanow (Universität-Newa St. Petersburg)
 Alexei Rastworzew (Medwedi Tschechow)
 Alexei Kostygow (Universität-Newa St. Petersburg)
 Alexei Kamanin (Medwedi Tschechow)
 Samwel Aslanjan (Medwedi Tschechow)
 Michail Tschipurin (Medwedi Tschechow)
 Eduard Kokscharow (RK Celje)
 Timur Dibirow (Medwedi Tschechow)
 Sergei Predybailow (Sarja Kaspija Astrachan)
 Konstantin Igropulo (FC Barcelona)
 Andrei Starych (Medwedi Tschechow)
 Witali Iwanow (Medwedi Tschechow)
 Dmitri Jerochin (Kaustik Wolgograd)
 Iwan Pronin (Universität-Newa St. Petersburg)
 Eldar Nassyrow (Universitet-Neva S.Peterburg)
 Alexei Kainarow (Sarja Kaspija Astrachan)
 Alexei Schindin (SKIF Krasnodar)
 Daniil Schischkarjow (Medwedi Tschechow)
 Alexander Kaschirin (Medwedi Tschechow)
 Jewgeni Pewnow (TSG Friesenheim)

Head coach: 

* Jewhen Budko (Medwedi Tschechow) 
 Mychajlo Krywtschykow (STR Saporischschja)
 Jewhen Konstantynow (STR Saporischschja)
 Serhij Bilyk (Aon Fivers)
 Olexij Hantschew (STR Saporischschja)
 Vitaliy Nat (KS Kielce)
 Serhij Onufrijenko (Dinamo Minsk)
 Jurij Petrenko (Paris HB)
 Olexandr Pedan (STR Saporischschja) 
 Olexandr Scheweljow (HK Portowyk Juschn)
 Wadym Braschnyk (Budiwelnyk Browary)
 Artem Wyschnewskyj (Universität-Newa St. Petersburg)
 Olexandr Petrow (Budiwelnyk Browary)
 Hennadij Komok (STR Saporischschja) 
 Wolodymyr Kyssil (STR Saporischschja)
 Artem Swjosdow (STR Saporischschja)
 Andrij Nataljuk (STR Saporischschja)
 Serhij Burka (STR Saporischschja)
 Serhij Ljubtschenko (STR Saporischschja)
 Wjatscheslaw Lotschman (Motor-SNTU-SAS)
 Serhij Schelmenko (Medwedi Tschechow)
 Wladyslaw Ostrouschko (STR Saporischschja)
 Borys Krjutschkow (HK Portowyk Juschne)
 Mykola Stezjura (STR Saporischschja)
 Jewhen Hurkowskyj (Ştiinţa Municipal Dedeman Bacău)
 , Dmytro Doroschtschuk (HK Portowyk Juschne)
 Kostjantyn Kyrylenko (Meschkow Brest)

Group B

Head coach: 

Squad: Thomas Bauer (TV Korschenbroich), Wolfgang Filzwieser (UHK Krems), Nikola Marinovic (HBW Balingen/Weilstetten); Feldspieler: Martin Abadir (aon Fivers), Damir Djukic (BM Alcobendas), Patrick Fölser (HSG Düsseldorf), Bernd Friede (TSV Otmar St.Gallen), Gregor Günther (A1 Bregenz), Matthias Günther (A1 Bregenz), Mare Hojc (HBW Balingen/Weilstetten), Michael Jochum (Alpla HC Hard), Klemens Kainmüller (HIT Innsbruck), Michael Knauth (Alpla HC Hard), Markus Kolar (aon Fivers), Stefan Lehner (HC Linz AG), Lucas Mayer (A1 Bregenz), Fabian Posch (A1 Bregenz), Roland Schlinger (A1 Bregenz), Tobias Schopf (UHK Krems), Viktor Szilágyi (VfL Gummersbach), Ibish Thaqi (aon Fivers), Kristof Vizvary (UHK Krems), Mario Vizvary (SPIGO West Wien), Markus Wagesreiter (HBW Balingen/Weilstetten), Robert Weber (SC Magdeburg), Konrad Wilczynski (Füchse Berlin), Richard Wöss (TUSEM Essen), Vytautas Žiūra (Viborg HK)

Head coach: 

Squad: Kasper Hvidt (FCK Håndbold), Niklas Landin Jacobsen (GOG Svendborg TGI), Thomas Mogensen (SG Flensburg-Handewitt), Torsten Laen (Füchse Berlin), Lars Jørgensen (AG Håndbold), Lars Christiansen (SG Flensburg-Handewitt), Anders Eggert Jensen (SG Flensburg-Handewitt), Bo Spellerberg (KIF Kolding), Michael V. Knudsen (SG Flensburg-Handewitt), Henrik Knudsen (KS Vive Kielce), Lasse Svan Hansen (SG Flensburg-Handewitt), Hans Lindberg (HSV Hamburg), Kasper Søndergaard Sarup (KIF Kolding), Mikkel Hansen (FC Barcelona), Kasper Nielsen (GOG Svendborg TGI), Mads Ø. Nielsen (Bjerringbro-Silkeborg); Reserve: Rene Toft Hansen (KIF Kolding), Nikolaj Markussen (Nordsjælland Håndbold)

Head coach: 

Squad: Björgvin Páll Gustavsson (Kadetten Schaffhausen), Hreiðar Guðmundsson (TV Emsdetten), Vignir Svavarsson (TBV Lemgo), Logi Geirsson (TBV Lemgo), Ásgeir Örn Hallgrímsson (GOG Svendsborg TGI), Arnór Atlason (FCK Håndbold), Guðjón Valur Sigurðsson (Rhein-Neckar Löwen), Snorri Guðjónsson (Rhein-Neckar Löwen), Ólafur Stefánsson (Rhein-Neckar Löwen), Alexander Petersson (SG Flensburg-Handewitt), Sverre Andreas Jakobsson (TV Großwallstadt), Róbert Gunnarsson (VfL Gummersbach), Ingimundur Ingimundarson (GWD Minden), Sturla Ásgeirsson (HSG Düsseldorf), Þórir Ólafsson (TuS Nettelstedt-Lübbecke), Aron Pálmarsson (THW Kiel), Ólafur Guðmundsson (FH Hafnarfjörður), Rúnar Kárason (Füchse Berlin)

Head coach: 

Squad: Darko Stanić (Cimos Koper), Dimitrije Pejanović (Torrevieja), Dragan Počuča (Tremblay), Ivan Nikčević (Navarra SA), Dobrivoje Marković (Cuenca 2016), Marko Curuvija (Metalurg), Nikola Kojić (Celje Pivovarna), Dragan Tubić (Partizan), Momir Ilić (THW Kiel), Žarko Šešum (KC Veszprém), Momir Rnić (Gorenje), Petar Đorđić (HSG Wetzlar), Mladen Bojinović (Montpellier HB), Danijel Anđelković (SC Szeged), Nenad Vučković (MT Melsungen), Uroš Mitrović (Creteil HB), Petar Nenadić (SC Szeged), Alexandar Stojanović (Kadetten Schaffhausen), Ivan Stanković (BM Aragon), Vukašin Rajković (FCK Håndbold), Ivan Lapcević (KC Veszprém), Ratko Nikolić (Navarra SA), Alem Toskić (Celje Pivovarna), Uroš Vilovski (KC Veszprém), Rastko Stojković (KS Vive Kielce)

Group C

Head coach: 

Squad: Silvio Heinevetter (Füchse Berlin), Johannes Bitter (HSV Hamburg), Carsten Lichtlein (TBV Lemgo), Stefan Kneer (TV Großwallstadt), Manuel Späth (FA Göppingen), Holger Glandorf (TBV Lemgo), Michael Müller (Rhein-Neckar Löwen), Martin Strobel (TBV Lemgo), Arne Niemeyer (TuS N-Lübbecke), Sven-Sören Christophersen (HSG Wetzlar), Patrick Groetzki (Rhein-Neckar Löwen), Christian Schöne (FA Göppingen), Dragos Oprea (FA Göppingen), Christian Sprenger (THW Kiel), Michael Kraus (TBV Lemgo), Nikolas Katsigiannis (TSV GWD Minden), Andrzej Rojewski (SC Magdeburg), Lars Kaufmann (FA Göppingen), Stefan Schröder (HSV Hamburg), Matthias Flohr (HSV Hamburg), Steffen Weinhold (TV Großwallstadt), Michael Haaß (FA Göppingen), Timo Salzer (HSG Wetzlar), Torsten Jansen (HSV Hamburg), Uwe Gensheimer (Rhein-Neckar Löwen), Oliver Roggisch (Rhein-Neckar Löwen), Christoph Theuerkauf (SC Magdeburg)

Head coach: 

Squad: Adam Malcher (Zagłębie Lubin), Sławomir Szmal (Rhein–Neckar Löwen), Piotr Wyszomirski (KS Azoty Puławy), Michał Adamuszek (MMTS Kwidzyn), Karol Bielecki (Rhein–Neckar Löwen), Rafał Gliński (KS Vive Targi Kielce), Piotr Grabarczyk (KS Vive Targi Kielce), Mateusz Jachlewski (KS Vive Targi Kielce), Bartłomiej Jaszka (Füchse Berlin), Mariusz Jurasik (KS Vive Targi Kielce), Bartosz Jurecki (SC Magdeburg), Michał Jurecki (TuS N-Lübbecke), Mariusz Jurkiewicz (Reyno de Navarra San Antonio), Damian Kostrzewa (AZS AWFiS Gdańsk), Kamil Krieger (KS Vive Targi Kielce), Patryk Kuchczyński (KS Vive Targi Kielce), Krzysztof Lijewski (HSV Hamburg), Marcin Lijewski (HSV Hamburg), Arkadiusz Miszka (Wisła Płock SA), Jarosław Paluch (SPR Chrobry Głogów), Paweł Piwko (KS Vive Targi Kielce), Paweł Podsiadło (KS Vive Targi Kielce), Tomasz Rosiński (KS Vive Targi Kielce), Artur Siódmiak (TuS N-Lübbecke), Tomasz Tłuczyński (TuS N-Lübbecke), Adam Twardo (Wisła Płock SA), Marcin Wichary (Wisła Płock S.A.), Daniel Żółtak (KS Vive Targi Kielce)

Head coach: 

Squad: Matjaž Brumen (RK Cimos Koper), Jure Dobelšek (RK Cimos Koper), Dragan Gajič (RK Zagreb), Vid Kavtičnik (Montpellier HB), Miladin Kozlina (RK Celje), Zoran Lubej (RK Zagreb), Jure Natek (RK Gorenje), Aleš Pajovič (RK Celje), Aljoša Rezar (RK Celje), Gorazd Škof (RK Zagreb), Sebastian Skube (RK Trimo Trebnje), David Špiler (RK Cimos Koper), Renato Vugrinec (RK Celje), Uroš Zorman (RK Celje), Luka Žvižej (SC Szeged), Miha Žvižej (RK Gorenje)

Head coach: 

Squad: Mattias Andersson (TV Großwallstadt), Dan Beutler (SG Flensburg-Handewitt), Anders Persson (Bjerringbro-Silkeborg), Per Sandström (HSV Hamburg), Johan Sjöstrand (SG Flensburg-Handewitt), Jonas Källman (BM Ciudad Real), Fredrik Petersen (GOG Svendborg TGI), Rasmus Wremer (AaB Håndbold), Robert Arrhenius (BM Aragón), Olof Ask (GOG Svendborg TGI), Nicklas Grundsten (BM Granollers), Mattias Gustafsson (AaB Håndbold), Niclas Ekberg (Ystads IF), Marcus Enström (Alingsås HK), Jan Lennartsson (AaB Håndbold), Kristian Bliznac (Alingsås HK), Kim Ekdahl Du Rietz (Lugi), Tobias Karlsson (SG Flensburg-Handewitt), Fredrik Larsson (BM Aragón), Jonathan Stenbäcken (IK Sävehof), Tobias Warvne (LIF Lindesberg), Dalibor Doder (Ademar León), Patrik Fahlgren (SG Flensburg-Handewitt), Lukas Karlsson (KIF Kolding), Kim Andersson (THW Kiel), Oscar Carlén (SG Flensburg Handewitt), Johan Jakobsson (IK Sävehof), Albin Tingsvall (Hammarby IF)

Group D

Head coach: 

Squad: Martin Galia (TBV Lemgo), Petr Štochl (Füchse Berlin), Miloš Slabý (TV Neuhausen), David Juříček (Montpellier HB), Tomáš Říha (HC Zubří), Václav Vraný (Coburg), Jiří Hynek (Ahlener SG), Karel Nocar (Chambéry), Pavel Mičkal (HSG Nordhorn), Jan Filip (Kadetten Schaffhausen), Jan Sobol (Montpellioer HB), Filip Jícha (THW Kiel), Daniel Kubeš (TBV Lemgo), Alois Mráz (HSG Wetzlar), Jan Stehlík (St. Raphael VAR HB), Tomáš Sklenák (ThSV Eisenach), Ondřej Zdráhala (Karviná), Jiří Vítek (Bergischer HC), Tomáš Mrkva (HCB Karviná), Jakub Hrstka (HC Zubří), Tomáš Číp (HC Zubří), Kamil Piskač (HC Dukla Praha), Tomáš Řezníček (Conversano), Ondřej Šulc (HCB Karviná), Jiří Motl (HC Lovosice), Jan Štochl (Bergischer HC), Martin Lehocký (Dukla Praha), Radek Horák (Dukla Praha)

Head coach: 

Squad: Jérôme Fernandez (BM Ciudad Real), Rémi Calvel (Toulouse HB), Daniel Narcisse (THW Kiel), Daouda Karaboué (Montpellier HB), Nikola Karabatić (Montpellier HB), Franck Junillon (MT Melsungen), Thierry Omeyer (THW Kiel), Didier Dinart (BM Ciudad Real), Luc Abalo (BM Ciudad Real), Cédric Sorhaindo (Toulouse HB), Michael Guigou (Montpellier HB), Xavier Barachet (Chambéry Savoie HB), Sébastien Bosquet (Dunkerque HB), Sébastien Ostertag (Tremblay en France), Gregoire Detrez (Chambéry Savoie HB), Cyril Dumoulin (Chambéry Savoie HB), Damien Waeghe (US Créteil HB), Bertrand Gille (HSV Hamburg), Guillaume Joli (Chambéry Savoie), Audray Tuzolana (HBC Nantes), Yohann Ploquin (ST Raphael VAR HB), Bertrand Roine (Chambéry Savoie), William Accambray (Montpellier HB), Guillaume Gille (HSV Hamburg), Cédric Paty (Chambéry Savoie), Olivier Marroux (US Ivry HB), Samuel Honrubia (Montpellier HB), Igor Anic (THW Kiel)

Head coach: 

Squad: Nándor Fazekas (MKB Veszprém KC) Roland Mikler (Dunaferr SE), Nenad Puljezević (TSV Hannover-Burgdorf); Feldspieler: György Bakos (Pler KC), Gábor Császár (Chambéry Savoie HB), Zsolt Balogh (Pler KC), Nikola Eklemović (MKB Veszprém KC), Gyula Gál (Tatabánya Carbonex), Gábor Grebenár (CCD Balonmano Aragon), Péter Gulyás (MKB Veszprém KC), Máté Halász (Tatabánya Carbonex), Gergely Harsányi (FTC Cityline), Gábor Herbert (SC Szeged), Ferenc Ilyés (TBV Lemgo), Gergő Iváncsik (MKB Veszprém KC), Tamás Iváncsik (MKB Veszprém KC), Dávid Katzirz (SC Szeged), Milorad Krivokapić (SC Szeged), Máté Lékai (Pler KC), Balázs Laluska (RR Cimos Koper), Szilveszter Liszkai (SC Szeged), Kornél Nagy (Dunaferr SC), Barna Putics (GWD Minden), István Rédei (JD Arrate), Timuzsin Schuch (HCM Constanta), Gábor Szalafai (Dunaferr SE), Szabolcs Törő (JD Arrate), Szabolcs Zubai (SC Szeged)

Head coach: 

Squad: José Javier Hombrados (BM Ciudad Real), Arpad Šterbik (BM Ciudad Real), José Manuel Sierra (BM Valladolid), Jorge Martinez (BM Antequera), Cristian Ugalde (FC Barcelona), Juanín García (FC Barcelona), David Davis (BM Ciudad Real), Víctor Tomás (FC Barcelona), Albert Rocas (FC Barcelona), Roberto García Parrondo (BM Ciudad Real), David Cuartero Sánchez (BM Torrevieja), Rubén Garabaya (FC Barcelona), Julen Aguinagalde (BM Ciudad Real), Carlos Prieto (Rhein-Neckar Löwen), Rafael Baena Gonzalez (BM Antequera), Asier Antonio Marcos (BM Valladolid), Alberto Entrerríos (BM Ciudad Real), Raúl Entrerríos (BM Valladolid), Viran Morros (BM Ciudad Real), Mikel Aguirrezabalaga (Ademar León), Chema Rodríguez (BM Ciudad Real), Daniel Sarmiento (FC Barcelona), Joan Cañellas (BM Ciudad Real), Álvaro Ferrer (BM Granollers), Iker Romero (FC Barcelona), Cristian Malmagro (SDC San Antonio), Jorge Maqueda (BM Aragón), Eduardo Gurbindo (BM Valladolid)

References

squads
European Handball Championship squads